Sanaahene is the title given to the royal treasurer. The title Sa-hene, is used primarily in Ghana and is given to a traditional ruler who is considered capable of leading the warring groups of the area. The Sa-hene is mandated to aid the paramount chief of an area in the performance of his duty. In the Central Region of Ghana, the Sa-hene has oversight over the Asafo group.

Popular use 
 Nana Kofi Obiri Egyir II -  Sanaahene of the Oguaa traditional area
 Nana Ogyabia Badu Ehuren - Sanaahen of Swedru
 Dr Esiem Kwaakontan II - Sanaahen of Denkyira Traditional Area
 Nana Gyasi Ataala VII - Sanaahen of Kwamankese

References 

Ghanaian military leaders